James DeSano is a retired orchestral trombonist. He served as associate principal trombone of the Cleveland Orchestra from 1970 to 1989 and as principal trombone from 1989 to his retirement in 2003. As a soloist with the Cleveland Orchestra, he performed Henri Tomasi's Trombone Concerto. Prior to his tenure in Cleveland, DeSano was principal trombone of the Syracuse Symphony Orchestra from 1964 to 1970.

Education 
DeSano attended the Eastman School of Music as a graduate student, where he studied with Emory Remington. He received his Bachelor's Degree in Music Education from Ithaca College.

Teaching 
DeSano was Professor of Trombone at the Oberlin Conservatory of Music from 1999 to 2013. During his time with the Cleveland Orchestra, he taught at the Cleveland Institute of Music. He has also served on the faculties of Kent State University, Syracuse University, and the University of Akron.

Notable pupils include Megumi Kanda, principal trombone of the Milwaukee Symphony Orchestra, James Box, principal trombone of the Montreal Symphony Orchestra, and Jeremy Buckler of the Atlanta Symphony Orchestra

Recordings 
 Brahms' Complete Symphonies, Vladimir Ashkenazy
 Schumann's 3rd and 4th Symphonies, Christoph von Dohnanyi
 Ravel's Boléro, Christoph von Dohnanyi
 Mahler's Symphony No. 7, Pierre Boulez
 Stravinsky’s The Rite of Spring, Pierre Boulez
 Shostakovich's Symphony No. 15, Kurt Sanderling

DeSano can also be heard in many Telarc recordings under the baton of Lorin Maazel.

References

External links 
http://yoa.org/Orchestra/Faculty/FacultyBios.aspx
http://www.trombone-usa.com/desano_james_bio.htm

American classical trombonists
Male trombonists
Living people
Cleveland Institute of Music faculty
21st-century classical trombonists
21st-century American male musicians
Year of birth missing (living people)